Rafael Farga i Pellicer (August 12, 1844 – August 12, 1890), also known as the "Just Pastor of Pellico", was a Catalan typesetter, political cartoonist, painter, syndicalist, anarchist and journalist from Spain.

Works and collaborations
Garibaldi. Historia Liberal del Siglo XIX. Ideas, Movimientos y Hombres Importantes. Estudios Filosofico-originales de escritores italianos, franceses y espanoles. Bajo la direccion de Justo Pastor de Pellico. Barcelona, La Academia of Evaristo Ullastres, 1882, 2 vols. 
Prolegómenos de la composición tipográfica. Barcelona: La Academia, 188?
Biografía de Miguel Bakunin with Miguel Bakunin sus ideales y tácticas & Bakunin's La escuela en el porvenir (The School of the Future). La Coruña, Aurora, (published posthumously c. 1916).
With Josep Llunas, "La familia; Datos de estadística universal", "¿Qué es anarquía?" y "La cuestión política", in Josep Llunas, Estudios filosófico-sociales. Barcelona, La Academia,  1882.

See also
International Anarchist Congresses
Anarchism in Spain

References
 Various authors. Història de la cultura catalana. Barcelona, edicions 62.
 Iñiguez Miguel. Esbozo de una enciclopedia histórica del anarquismo. Madrid, Fundación Anselmo Lorenzo, 2001.
 Juan Gómez Casas, Historia del anarcosindicalismo español, Madrid: Editorial ZYX, 1968.

External links
Biography in 'Cuaderns d'inpertinencia' (in Catalán)

1844 births
1890 deaths
19th-century Spanish journalists
19th-century male writers
Collectivist anarchists
Male journalists
People from Barcelona
Spanish anarchists
Spanish cartoonists
19th-century Spanish painters
Typesetters